Joe Zorica (born November 28, 1934) is a Canadian retired professional hockey player who played 375 games in the Eastern Hockey League with the Knoxville Knights and Nashville Dixie Flyers.

External links
 

1934 births
Living people
People from Rouyn-Noranda
Nashville Dixie Flyers players
Canadian ice hockey right wingers